Lingotek is a cloud-based translation services provider, offering translation management software and professional linguistic services for web content, software platforms, product documentation and electronic documents.

Company History
Lingotek was founded in 2006 and received $1.7 million in Series A-1 venture capital funding from Canopy Ventures and Flywheel Ventures to develop language search engine technologies.

In 2007, the software development company secured $1.6 million in Series A-2 financing. The A-2 round was led by Canopy Ventures of Lindon, Utah, which contributed $1 million. Previous investors, including Flywheel Ventures, also participated in the A-2 round. The funding was to expand its sales and marketing efforts and further increase Lingotek's presence in the language translation market.

On July 16, 2008, Lingotek received an investment from In-Q-Tel, a not-for-profit investment firm that delivers technology to support the Central Intelligence Agency and the broader U.S. Intelligence Community. Launched by the CIA in 1999 as a private, independent organization, In-Q-Tel's function is to identify and partner with companies developing technologies that serve the national security interests of the United States. In exchange, Lingotek was to provide a platform to facilitate more efficient, faster language translation. The agreement funded the development and enhancement of new global collaboration translation technology. The In-Q-Tel investment was also part of a Series B funding round, with participation by Flywheel Ventures, and Canopy Ventures. The funds were used to expand business operations, distribution, and further develop Lingotek's language technology capabilities.

Products
In 2006, Lingotek was the first U.S. company to launch a fully online, web-based, computer-assisted translation (CAT) system and pioneered the integration of translation memories (TM) with a main-frame powered machine translation (MT). While the translation products of more than a dozen European companies appeared in the U.S. market, the only standalone tools to directly support human translators developed in the U.S. were Lingotek in 2006. The developer was based in Utah and came from within the LDS Church. The LDS Church uses Lingotek as its preferred tool for its crowdsourcing translation. While Lingotek was originally marketed to government entities, translation companies, and freelance translators, the current marketing effort is focused on larger corporations with translation needs.

In August, 2006, Lingotek launched a beta version of its collaborative language translation service that enhanced a translator's efficiency by quickly finding meaning-based translated material for reuse. Branded as the Lingotek Collaborative Translation Platform, the service was based on three tiers of translation: automatic, community, and professional. Lingotek's language search engine indexed linguistic knowledge from a growing repository of multilingual content and language translations, instead of web pages. Users could then access its database of previously translated material to find more specific combinations of words for re-use. Such meaning-based searching maintained better style, tone, and terminology. Lingotek ran within most popular web browsers, including initial support for Internet Explorer and Firefox. Lingotek supported Microsoft Office, Microsoft Word, Rich Text Format (RTF), Open Office, HTML, XHTML, and Microsoft Excel formats, thereby allowing users to upload such documents directly into Lingotek. Lingotek also supported existing translation memory files that were Translation Memory eXchange (TMX)-compliant memories, thus allowing users to import TMX files into both private and public indices.

In June 2007, Lingotek began offering free access to its language search engine and other web 2.0-based translation-related software tools. Free access to the language search engine included both open and closed translation memory (TM). The Lingotek project management system helped project managers track translation projects in real-time. The system's alignment tool, glossary capabilities, version tracking and other tools were all included and available at no charge to all Lingotek users.

In 2008, Lingotek moved to Amazon Web Services's on-demand cloud computing platform. The Lingotek TMS has long been used internally and for government agencies. The company's first version of the product was a hosted, multi-tenant web app in 2006, which moved into the Amazon cloud in 2008. Though chiefly known in the industry as a technology-enabled LSP, Lingotek has been licensing the system separately, to customers that don't have a language services relationship. Due to its connectivity, scalability, security, and strong feature set, this is an option that enterprises should consider for their own translation environments. Lingotek's system was developed specifically with mass collaboration in mind.

The company introduced software-as-a-service (SaaS) collaborative translation technology in 2009, which combined the workflow and computer-aided translation (CAT) capabilities of human and machine translation into one application. Organizations can upload new projects, assign translators (paid or unpaid), check the status of current projects in real time, and download completed documents from any computer with web access.

In 2010, Lingotek re-positioned its Collaborative Translation Platform (CTP) as a software-as-a-service (SaaS) product which combined machine translation, real-time community translation, and management tools.

Lingotek's cloud-based CAT system was available on the market in 2012. The translation system can process text files and offers comprehensive support for the localization of web page files in HTML. In addition, the Lingotek CAT tools can handle several file types, including:
 Microsoft Office,  Microsoft Word, Microsoft PowerPoint, and Microsoft Excel;
 Adobe FrameMaker files;
 Files with the standardized format for localization: XML Localisation Interchange File Format (.xliff), .ttx (XML font file format) files, and .po (portable  object);
 Java properties files;
 OpenDocument files;
 Windows resource files;
 Mac OS and OS X; and
 TMX (Translation Memory eXchange).
Lingotek's stand‐alone translation management system (TMS) can be used to manage translation workflow for many different types of assets, from documents to websites. Since different types of content require different workflows, and often different service providers, Lingotek's enterprise TMS enables operators to manage not just the translation process, but also the vendor supply chain.

In 2010, Lingotek integrated the Collaborative Translation Platform with other applications. The Lingotek - Inside API (application programming interface) allows users to translate content in web applications such as SharePoint, Drupal, Salesforce.com, Jive Social CRM, and Oracle universal content management (UCM).

Lingotek translation connectors work in conjunction with other content creation tools such as Drupal and WordPress, that integrate with its TMS. In 2016, the company was named a Top 30 Drupal Contributor.

Lingotek's TMS added multi-vendor translation, which enables brands to choose any translation agency for in-workflow translation in 2014.

Awards and recognition
Lingotek was named Comparably Best Places to Work 2017 and received an award for Utah Best in State Language Services 2017. In 2016, Lingotek was identified as a Top 30 Drupal Contributor. The company was a Bronze Winner of the 2015 Edison Award Verbal Communications; named a CIO Microsoft 100 Solution Provider by CIO Review; a Gartner Cool Vendor of the Year (2012), and received the Stevie Award for Best New Product or Service of the Year – Software as a Service (2010). In 2006, Lingotek was named Most Innovative Product by Utah Valley Entrepreneurial Forum.

See also 

 LanguageTool
 vidby

References

Translation companies